Eveland is a surname. Notable people with the surname include:

Dana Eveland (born 1983), American baseball player
Dennis Eveland (born 1952), American guitarist and electronic musician
Wilbur Crane Eveland (1918-1990), American CIA station chief
William Perry Eveland (1864–1916), American Methodist bishop